The George Pick House is a historic house at 970 Sheridan Road in Highland Park, Illinois. The house was built in the early twentieth century for businessman George Pick. Prolific Chicago architect Howard Van Doren Shaw, who also designed several other homes in Highland Park, designed the house. Shaw gave the house an Eclectic Revival design with extensive detail work inspired by architectural styles from throughout Europe. The house's features include carved limestone birds, gables with decorative bargeboards, and an arcade at the entrance.

The house was added to the National Register of Historic Places on September 29, 1982.

References

National Register of Historic Places in Lake County, Illinois
Houses on the National Register of Historic Places in Illinois
Highland Park, Illinois